Carex subfilicinoides is a tussock-forming perennial in the family Cyperaceae. It is native to southern parts of Central China.

See also
 List of Carex species

References

subfilicinoides
Plants described in 1929
Taxa named by Georg Kükenthal
Flora of China